Road 43 is a road in Khuzestan Province, of western coastal Iran.

It connects Mahshahr to the Shiraz-Ahvaz main Road and to Ramhormoz.

References

External links 

 Iran road map on Young Journalists Club

43
Transportation in Khuzestan Province